In enzymology, a flavonol-3-O-glycoside xylosyltransferase is an enzyme that catalyzes the chemical reaction

UDP-D-xylose + a flavonol 3-O-glycoside  UDP + a flavonol 3-[-D-xylosyl-(1->2)-beta-D-glycoside]

Thus, the two substrates of this enzyme are UDP-D-xylose and flavonol 3-O-glycoside, whereas its two products are UDP and [[flavonol 3-[-D-xylosyl-(1->2)-beta-D-glycoside]]].

This enzyme belongs to the family of glycosyltransferases, specifically the pentosyltransferases.  The systematic name of this enzyme class is UDP-D-xylose:flavonol-3-O-glycoside 2''-O-beta-D-xylosyltransferase.

References

 
 

EC 2.4.2
Enzymes of unknown structure